Douglas Ralph Manley (30 May 1922 – 26 July 2013) was a Jamaican politician, Member of Parliament (MP), and Government Minister.  He was the son of Jamaican premier Norman Washington Manley and Edna Manley and the older brother of former Jamaican Prime Minister, Michael Manley.

Manley served as the MP for South Manchester, Jamaica from 1972 to 1980 and 1989 to 1993. Manley also served as a Minister of Youth and Community Development, Minister of Agriculture, and Minister of Health during the 1970s.

Douglas Manley attended St Andrew's Preparatory School and secondary school at Munro College.   He obtained a bachelor's degree in sociology from Columbia University and a PhD in sociology from the University of Liverpool, England. Manley was a professor in Sociology at the University of the West Indies, Mona Campus. 

Manley was also an athlete. In 1941, at Jamaica's inter-secondary schoolboys' track and field athletics championships, Manley equalled the record set by his father, Norman, in the 100 yard dash.

Manley was married to Carmen Lawrence, a Jamaican actress and playwright, and had two sons, Norman and Roy. 

Manley was awarded the Order of Jamaica for service to his country.

Douglas Manley died on 26 July 2013 at the age of 91.

References

1922 births
2013 deaths
Members of the House of Representatives of Jamaica
Ministers of Health of Jamaica
Douglas
People educated at Munro College
Jamaican expatriates in the United Kingdom
Jamaican expatriates in the United States